Darren Breslin is a North Ireland traditional musician. He is a former All Ireland Champion in the button accordion competition, which he won in 2008 for London cc.

Breslin comes from the Lisnaskea area in County Fermanagh in Northern Ireland but won his all Ireland for London cce. He got interested in the music when he started playing with his grandfather Brian Breslin who plays the fiddle; Beslin's father also plays the fiddle and banjo. Breslin started playing at the age of eight.

References

Year of birth missing (living people)
Living people
21st-century accordionists
Irish accordionists
Musicians from County Fermanagh
People from Lisnaskea
Place of birth missing (living people)